Lieutenant-General Richard G. England (c. 1750 – 7 November 1812) of Lifford, County Clare was a British Army officer who became Lieutenant-Governor of Plymouth.

Military career
England was commissioned as an ensign in the 47th Regiment of Foot on 20 November 1765.

He fought at the Battle of Bunker Hill in June 1775, the Battle of Quebec in December 1775 and the Battles of Saratoga, where he was taken prisoner, in Autumn 1777 during the American Revolutionary War. Promoted to lieutenant-colonel, he became commanding officer of the 24th Regiment of Foot on 20 February 1783.

He became Commandant of Detroit in June 1792 and was one of the first colonists of Western Upper Canada. He went on to be Lieutenant-Governor of Plymouth and General Officer Commanding Western District in August 1803. He was also colonel of the 5th Regiment of Foot.

References

British Army lieutenant generals
1750 births
1812 deaths
47th Regiment of Foot officers
American Revolutionary War prisoners of war held by the United States
British Army personnel of the American Revolutionary War